Phosphorylase b kinase regulatory subunit alpha, skeletal muscle isoform is an enzyme that in humans is encoded by the PHKA1 gene. It is the muscle isoform of Phosphorylase kinase (PhK).

The PHKA1 gene encodes the alpha subunit of muscle phosphorylase kinase (EC 2.7.1.38), a key regulatory enzyme of glycogen metabolism. Phosphorylase kinase consists of 4 copies of an alpha-beta-gamma-delta tetramer. The alpha, beta (PHKB; MIM 172490), and gamma (PHKG1; MIM 172470 and PHKG2; MIM 172471) subunits have several isoforms; the delta subunit is calmodulin (CALM1; MIM 114180). PHKA2 (MIM 306000) encodes the alpha subunit of liver-specific phosphorylase kinase and is also located on the X chromosome.[supplied by OMIM]

A deficiency of this enzyme causes glycogen storage disease type IXd (GSD 9D).

References

Further reading

External links
  GeneReviews/NCBI/NIH/UW entry on Phosphorylase Kinase Deficiency, Glycogen Storage Disease Type IX

EC 2.7.11